Puppet Show is the second full-length album by the Japanese rock group Plastic Tree released on August 28, 1998.

Track listing 

Plastic Tree albums
1998 albums